HMS Lion was a battlecruiser built for the Royal Navy in the 1910s. She was the lead ship of her class, which were nicknamed the "Splendid Cats".

Lion served as the flagship of the Grand Fleet's battlecruisers throughout World War I, except when she was being refitted or under repair. She sank the German light cruiser  during the Battle of Heligoland Bight and served as Vice-Admiral David Beatty's flagship at the battles of Dogger Bank and Jutland. She was so badly damaged at the first of these battles that she had to be towed back to port and was under repair for more than two months. During the Battle of Jutland she suffered a serious propellant fire that could have destroyed the ship had it not been for the bravery of Royal Marine Major Francis Harvey, the gun turret commander, who posthumously received the Victoria Cross for having ordered the magazine flooded. The fire destroyed one gun turret which had to be removed for rebuilding while she was under repair for several months. She spent the rest of the war on uneventful patrols in the North Sea, although she did provide distant cover during the Second Battle of Heligoland Bight in 1917. She was put into reserve in 1920 and sold for scrap in 1924 under the terms of the Washington Naval Treaty.

Design
The Lion-class battlecruisers were designed to be as superior to the new German battlecruisers of the Moltke class as the German ships were to the Invincible class. The increase in speed, armour and gun size forced a 65 per cent increase in size over the Indefatigable class.

Propulsion

Lion had two paired sets of Parsons direct-drive steam turbines, each driving two propeller shafts using steam provided by 42 Yarrow boilers. She carried  of coal, and an additional  of fuel oil that was sprayed on the coal to increase its burn rate.

Armament
Lion mounted eight BL  Mk V guns in four twin-gun turrets, designated 'A', 'B', 'Q' and 'X' from front to rear. Her secondary armament consisted of sixteen BL  Mark VII guns, most of which were mounted in casemates. The two guns mounted above the forward group of casemates were given gun shields during 1913–1914 to better protect the gun crews from weather and enemy action. The starboard forward group of 4-inch guns was removed after April 1917.

She was built without anti-aircraft (AA) guns, but a single quick-firing (QF) 6-pounder (57 mm) Hotchkiss gun on a high-angle mounting was fitted from October 1914 to July 1915. A single QF  AA gun was added in January 1915, and another the following July. Two  submerged torpedo tubes were fitted, one on each broadside; fourteen torpedoes were carried.

Armour
It thinned to 4 inches towards the ships' ends, but did not reach either the bow or the stern. Nickel steel torpedo bulkheads 2.5 inches thick were fitted abreast the magazines and shell rooms.

Wartime modifications
Lion received a fire-control director between mid-1915 and May 1916 that centralised the pointing and firing of the guns under the command of the director positioned on the foremast. The turret crewmen merely had to follow pointers controlled by the director to align their guns on the target. This greatly increased accuracy as it was easier to spot the fall of shells and eliminated the problem of the ship's roll dispersing the shells as each turret fired individually.

By early 1918 Lion carried a Sopwith Pup and a Sopwith 1½ Strutter on flying-off platforms fitted on top of 'Q' and 'X' turrets. Each platform had a canvas hangar to protect the aircraft during inclement weather.

Construction and career
Lion was laid down at the Devonport Dockyard, Plymouth, on 29 November 1909. She was launched on 6 August 1910 and was commissioned on 4 June 1912. Upon commissioning, Lion became the flagship of the 1st Cruiser Squadron, which was renamed the 1st Battlecruiser Squadron (BCS) in January 1913. Rear Admiral Beatty assumed command of the 1st BCS on 1 March 1913. Lion, along with the rest of the 1st BCS, made a port visit to Brest in February 1914 and the squadron visited Russia in June, where Lions officers entertained the Russian imperial family aboard while in Kronstadt.

World War I

Battle of Heligoland Bight

Lions first action was as flagship of the battlecruiser force under the command of Admiral Beatty during the Battle of Heligoland Bight on 28 August 1914. Beatty's ships had originally been intended as distant support of the British cruisers and destroyers closer to the German coast in case the large ships of the High Seas Fleet sortied in response to the British attacks. They turned south at full speed at 11:35 when the British light forces failed to disengage on schedule and the rising tide meant that German capital ships would be able to clear the bar at the mouth of the Jade Estuary. The brand-new light cruiser  had been crippled earlier in the battle and was under fire from the German light cruisers  and  when Beatty's battlecruisers loomed out of the mist at 12:37. Strassburg was able to duck into the mists and evade fire, but Cöln remained visible and was quickly crippled by fire from the squadron. Beatty, however, was distracted from the task of finishing her off by the sudden appearance of the elderly light cruiser  directly to his front. He turned in pursuit and reduced her to a flaming hulk in only three salvos at close range–under . At 13:10 Beatty turned north and made a general signal to retire. Beatty's main body encountered the crippled Cöln shortly after turning north and she was sunk by two salvos from Lion.

Raid on Scarborough

The German Navy had decided on a strategy of bombarding British towns on the North Sea coast to draw out the Royal Navy and destroy elements of it in detail. An earlier Raid on Yarmouth on 3 November had been partially successful, but a larger-scale operation was devised by Admiral Franz von Hipper afterwards. The fast battlecruisers would actually conduct the bombardment while the entire High Seas Fleet was to station itself east of Dogger Bank to provide cover for their return and to destroy any elements of the Royal Navy that responded to the raid. But what the Germans did not know was that the British were reading the German naval codes and were planning to catch the raiding force on its return journey, although they were not aware that the High Seas Fleet would be at sea as well. Admiral Beatty's 1st BCS, now reduced to four ships, including Lion, as well as Vice-Admiral Sir George Warrender's 2nd Battle Squadron with six dreadnoughts, was detached from the Grand Fleet in an attempt to intercept the Germans near Dogger Bank.

Admiral Hipper set sail on 15 December 1914 for another such raid and successfully bombarded several English towns, but British destroyers escorting the 1st BCS had already encountered German destroyers of the High Seas Fleet at 05:15 and fought an inconclusive action with them. Warrender had received a signal at 05:40 that the destroyer  was engaging enemy destroyers although Beatty had not. The destroyer  spotted the German armoured cruiser  and her escorts at about 07:00, but could not transmit the message until 07:25. Admiral Warrender received the signal, as did the battlecruiser , but Beatty did not, despite the fact that New Zealand had been specifically tasked to relay messages between the destroyers and Beatty. Warrender attempted to pass on Sharks message to Beatty at 07:36, but did not manage to make contact until 07:55. Beatty reversed course when he got the message and dispatched New Zealand to search for Roon. She was being overhauled by New Zealand when Beatty received messages that Scarborough was being shelled at 09:00. Beatty ordered New Zealand to rejoin the squadron and turned west for Scarborough.

The British forces split going around the shallow Southwest Patch of the Dogger Bank; Beatty's ships passed to the north while Warrender passed to the south as they headed west to block the main route through the minefields defending the English coast. This left a  gap between them through which the German light forces began to move. At 12:25, the light cruisers of the II Scouting Group began to pass the British forces searching for Hipper. The light cruiser  spotted the light cruiser  and signalled a report to Beatty. At 12:30 Beatty turned his battlecruisers towards the German ships. Beatty presumed that the German cruisers were the advance screen for Hipper's ships, however, those were some 50 km (31 mi) behind. The 2nd Light Cruiser Squadron, which had been screening for Beatty's ships, detached to pursue the German cruisers, but a misinterpreted signal from the British battlecruisers sent them back to their screening positions. This confusion allowed the German light cruisers to escape, and alerted Hipper to the location of the British battlecruisers. The German battlecruisers wheeled to the northeast of the British forces and made good their escape.

Battle of Dogger Bank

On 23 January 1915, a force of German battlecruisers under the command of Admiral Franz von Hipper sortied to clear the Dogger Bank of any British fishing boats or small craft that might be there to collect intelligence on German movements. However, the British were reading their coded messages and sailed to intercept them with a larger force of British battlecruisers under the command of Admiral Beatty. Contact was initiated at 07:20 on the 24th when the British light cruiser Arethusa spotted the German light cruiser .

Beatty ordered his battlecruisers to make all practicable speed to catch the Germans before they could escape. The other ships followed a few minutes later but, hampered by the extreme range and decreasing visibility, they did not score their first hit on Blücher until 09:09. They first hit her at 9:28 on the waterline with a shell that flooded a coal bunker. Shortly afterwards a  shell from Blücher hit the roof of 'A' turret, denting it and knocking out the left gun for two hours. However, Lion scored the first serious hit of the battle when one of her shells penetrated the working chamber of Seydlitzs rear barbette at 09:40 and ignited the propellant lying exposed. The resulting fire spread into the other turret and burnt out both of them, killing 159 men. Seydlitz returned the damage at 10:01 with a  shell that ricocheted off the water and pierced Lions five-inch armour aft, although it failed to explode. However, the resulting  hole flooded the low power switchboard compartment and eventually shorted out two of Lions three dynamos.  scored the most telling hits on Lion at 10:18 when two  shells struck her port side below the waterline. The shock was so great that her captain, Ernle Chatfield, thought that she had been torpedoed. One shell pierced the five-inch armour forward and burst in a wing compartment behind the armour. It drove in a  piece of armour and flooded several compartments adjacent to the torpedo flat and the torpedo body room. One splinter put a hole in the exhaust pipe of the capstan engine which eventually contaminated the auxiliary condenser with saltwater. The other shell hit further aft and burst on the six-inch portion of the waterline belt. At 10:41 a 283 mm shell burst against the eight-inch armour of 'A' barbette, but only started a small fire in the 'A' turret lobby that was quickly put out, although the magazine was partially flooded when a false report was received that it was on fire as well. Soon afterwards Lion was hit by a number of shells in quick succession, but only one of these was serious. A shell burst on the nine-inch armour belt abreast the engine room and drove a  armour plate about two feet inboard and ruptured the port engine's feedwater tank.

Beatty ordered  to attack her at 10:48. Six minutes later Beatty spotted what he thought was a submarine periscope on the starboard bow and ordered an immediate 90° turn to port to avoid the submarine, although he failed to hoist the 'Submarine Warning' flag because most of Lions signal halyards had been shot away. Almost immediately afterwards Lion lost her remaining dynamo to the rising water which knocked out all remaining light and power. He ordered 'Course Northeast' at 11:02 to bring his ships back to their pursuit of Hipper. He also hoisted 'Attack the rear of the enemy' on the other halyard although there was no connection between the two signals. Beatty tried to correct the mistake, but he was so far behind the leading battlecruisers that his signals could not be read amidst the smoke and haze.

Lions starboard engine was temporarily shut down due to contaminated feed water, but it was restarted and Lion headed home at  when the rest of the battlecruisers caught up with her around 12:45.

Lion was temporarily repaired at Rosyth with timber and concrete before sailing to Newcastle upon Tyne to be repaired by Palmers; the Admiralty did not wish it known that she was damaged badly enough to require repair at either Portsmouth or Devonport Dockyards lest that be seen as a sign of defeat. She rejoined the Battlecruiser Fleet, again as Beatty's flagship, on 7 April. She had fired 243 rounds from her main guns, but had only made four hits: one each on Blücher and Derfflinger, and two on Seydlitz. In return she had been hit by the Germans sixteen times, but only suffered one man killed and twenty wounded.

Battle of Jutland

On 31 May 1916 Lion was the flagship of Admiral Beatty's Battlecruiser Fleet which had put to sea to intercept a sortie by the High Seas Fleet into the North Sea. The British were able to decode the German radio messages and left their bases before the Germans put to sea. Hipper's battlecruisers spotted the Battlecruiser Fleet to their west at 15:20, but Beatty's ships did not spot the Germans to their east until ten minutes later. Almost immediately afterwards, at 15:32, he ordered a course change to east-south-east to position himself astride the Germans' line of retreat and called his ships' crews to action stations. With this turn Hipper was falling back on the High Seas Fleet, then about  behind him. Around this time Beatty altered course to the east as it was quickly apparent that he was still too far north to cut off Hipper.

This began what was to be called the 'Run to the South' as Beatty changed course to steer east-south-east at 15:45, paralleling Hipper's course, now that the range closed to under . The Germans opened fire first at 15:48, followed almost immediately afterwards by the British. The German fire was accurate from the beginning, but the British overestimated the range as the German ships blended into the haze. Lion, as the leading British ship, engaged , her opposite number in the German formation. Lützows fire was very accurate, and Lion was hit twice within three minutes of the Germans' opening fire. The shell penetrated the joint between the nine-inch turret faceplate and the 3.5-inch roof and detonated over the centre of the left-hand gun. It blew the front roof plate and the centre faceplate off the turret, killed or wounded everyone in the turret, and started a fire that smouldered, despite efforts to put it out that had been thought to have been successful. Accounts of subsequent events differ, but the magazine doors had been closed and the magazine flooded when the smouldering fire ignited the eight full propellant charges in the turret working room at 16:28. They burned violently, with the flames reaching as high as the masthead, and killed most of the magazine and shell room crews still in the lower part of the mounting. The gas pressure severely buckled the magazine doors, and the magazine would probably have exploded if it had not already been flooded. Royal Marine Major Francis Harvey, the mortally wounded turret commander, was posthumously awarded the Victoria Cross for having ordered the magazine flooded.

At 16:11 Lion observed the track of a torpedo fired by Moltke pass astern, but it was thought that the torpedo was fired by a U-boat on the disengaged side. This was confirmed when the destroyer  reported having spotted a periscope before the torpedo tracks were seen. The range had grown too far for accurate shooting so Beatty altered course four points to port to close the range again between 16:12 and 16:15. This resulted in Lion hitting Lützow again at 16:14, but Lützow hit Lion several times in return shortly afterwards. However, it was too late for Queen Mary, which was hit multiple times in quick succession about that time, and her forward magazines exploded. At 16:30 the light cruiser , scouting in front of Beatty's ships, spotted the lead elements of the High Seas Fleet charging north at top speed. Three minutes later she sighted the topmasts of Vice-Admiral Reinhard Scheer's battleships, but did not transmit a message to Beatty for another five minutes. Beatty continued south for another two minutes to confirm the sighting himself before ordering a sixteen-point turn to starboard in succession.

Lion was hit twice more, during what came to be called the 'Run to the North', after the German battlecruisers made their own turn north. Beatty's ships maintained full speed to try to put some separation between them and the High Seas Fleet and gradually moved out of range. They turned north and then northeast to try to rendezvous with the main body of the Grand Fleet. At 17:40 they opened fire again on the German battlecruisers. The setting sun blinded the German gunners, and they could not make out the British ships and turned away to the northeast at 17:47. Beatty gradually turned more towards the east to allow him to cover the deployment of the Grand Fleet into its battle formation and to move ahead of it, but he mistimed his manoeuvre and forced the leading division to fall off towards the east, further away from the Germans. By 18:35 Beatty was following the 3rd BCS as they were steering east-south-east, leading the Grand Fleet, and continuing to engage Hipper's battlecruisers to their southwest. A few minutes earlier Scheer had ordered a simultaneous 180° starboard turn, and Beatty lost sight of them in the haze. At 18:44 Beatty turned his ships southeast and to the south-south-east four minutes later searching for Hipper's ships. Beatty took this opportunity to recall the two surviving ships of the 3rd BCS to take position astern of New Zealand and then slowed down to eighteen knots and altered course to the south to prevent himself from getting separated from the Grand Fleet. At this moment Lions gyrocompass failed, and she made a complete circle before her steering was brought under control again. At 18:55 Scheer ordered another 180° turn, which put them on a converging course again with the Grand Fleet, which had altered course itself to the south. This allowed the Grand Fleet to cross Scheer's T, and they badly damaged his leading ships. Scheer ordered yet another 180° turn at 19:13 in an attempt to extricate the High Seas Fleet from the trap into which he had sent them.

This manoeuvre was successful, and the British lost sight of the Germans until 20:05, when the light cruiser  spotted smoke bearing west-north-west. Ten minutes later she had closed the range enough to identify German torpedo boats and had engaged them. Inflexible opened fire at 20:20, followed almost immediately by the rest of Beatty's battlecruisers. Shortly after 20:30 the pre-dreadnought battleships of Rear Admiral Mauve's II Battle Squadron were spotted and fire switched to them. The Germans were able to fire only a few rounds at them because of the poor visibility and turned away to the west. The British battlecruisers hit the German ships several times before they blended into the haze around 20:40. After this Beatty changed course to south-southeast and maintained that course, ahead of both the Grand Fleet and the High Seas Fleet, until 02:55 the next morning when the order was given to reverse course.

Lion and the rest of the battlecruisers reached Rosyth on the morning of 2 June 1916 where she began repairs that lasted until 19 July. The remains of 'Q' turret were removed during this period and not replaced until later. She had been hit a total of fourteen times and suffered 99 dead and 51 wounded during the battle. She also fired seven torpedoes, four at the German battleships, two at Derfflinger and one at the light cruiser  without success.

Post-Jutland career
She rejoined the Battlecruiser Fleet, again as Beatty's flagship, on 19 July 1916 without 'Q' turret, but then had the turret replaced during a visit to Armstrong Whitworth at Elswick that lasted from 6 to 23 September. In the meantime, on the evening of 18 August the Grand Fleet put to sea in response to a message deciphered by Room 40 which indicated that the High Seas Fleet, less the II Squadron, would be leaving harbour that night. The German objective was to bombard Sunderland on the 19th, with extensive reconnaissance provided by airships and submarines. The Grand Fleet sailed with 29 dreadnought battleships and six battlecruisers. Throughout the 19th, Jellicoe and Scheer received conflicting intelligence, with the result that having reached its rendezvous in the North Sea, the Grand Fleet steered north in the erroneous belief that it had entered a minefield before turning south again. Scheer steered south-eastward pursuing a lone British battle squadron reported by an airship, which was in fact the Harwich Force under Commodore Tyrwhitt. Having realised their mistake the Germans then shaped course for home. The only contact came in the evening when Tyrwhitt sighted the High Seas Fleet but was unable to achieve an advantageous attack position before dark, and broke off contact. Both the British and the German fleets returned home, the British having lost two cruisers to submarine attacks and the Germans having a dreadnought damaged by torpedo.

Lion became the flagship of Vice-Admiral W. C. Pakenham in December 1916 when he assumed command of the Battlecruiser Fleet upon Beatty's promotion to command of the Grand Fleet. Lion had an uneventful time for the rest of the war, conducting patrols of the North Sea as the High Seas Fleet was forbidden to risk any more losses. She provided support for British light forces involved in the Second Battle of Heligoland Bight on 17 November 1917, but never came within range of any German forces. The 1st BCS, including Lion, sailed on 12 December in a futile attempt to intercept the German destroyers that had sunk the convoy en route to Norway earlier that day, but returned to base the following day. Lion, along with the rest of the Grand Fleet, sortied on the afternoon of 23 March 1918 after radio transmissions had revealed that the High Seas Fleet was at sea after a failed attempt to intercept the regular British convoy to Norway. However, the Germans were too far ahead of the British and escaped without firing a shot. When the High Seas Fleet sailed for Scapa Flow on 21 November 1918 to be interned, she was among the escorting ships. Along with the rest of the 1st BCS she guarded the interned ships until she was assigned to the Atlantic Fleet in April 1919 and then placed in reserve in March 1920. Paid off on 30 March 1922, despite a press campaign to have her saved for the nation as a memorial, Lion was sold for scrap on 31 January 1924 for £77,000 to meet the tonnage limitations of the Washington Naval Treaty.

Notes

References

Bibliography

External links

 Account of the battle of Jutland by Alexander Grant, a gunner aboard Lion
 Maritimequest HMS Lion Photo Gallery
 Battle of Jutland Crew Lists Project – HMS Lion Crew List

 

1910 ships
Lion-class battlecruisers
World War I battlecruisers of the United Kingdom